The 2003 Men's EuroHockey Nations Championship was the ninth edition of the Men's EuroHockey Nations Championship, the quadrennial international men's field hockey championship of Europe organized by the European Hockey Federation. It was held from 1 until 13 September 2003 in Barcelona, Spain.

This was the last EuroHockey Nations Championship with 12 teams. The 4 teams ending 9th, 10th, 11th, and 12th were relegated to the EuroHockey Nations Trophy. The 8 remaining teams played in the 2005 Men's EuroHockey Nations Championship. The tournament also served as a direct qualifier for the 2004 Summer Olympics, with the winner Germany qualifying.

Three-time defending champions Germany won their sixth overall title by defeating the hosts Spain 5–4 in penalty strokes after the match finished 1–1 after extra time. England won the bronze medal by defeating the Netherlands 6–5 in penalty strokes after the match finished 1–1 after extra time.

Qualified teams

Format
The twelve teams were split into two groups of six teams. The top two teams advanced to the semi-finals in order to determine the winner in a knockout system. The 3rd and 4th placed teams from each pool played for the 5th to 8th place, while the 5th and 6th placed teams from each pool played for the 9th to 12th place. The last four teams were relegated to the EuroHockey Nations Challenge.

Results
''All times were local (UTC+2).

Preliminary round

Pool A

Pool B

Ninth to twelfth place classification

9–12th place semi-finals

Eleventh place game

Ninth place game

Fifth to eighth place classification

5–8th place semi-finals

Seventh place game

Fifth place game

First to fourth place classification

Semi-finals

Third place game

Final

Final standings

See also
2003 Women's EuroHockey Nations Championship

References

 
Men's EuroHockey Nations Championship
Men 1
EuroHockey Nations Championship Men
International field hockey competitions hosted by Catalonia
Sports competitions in Barcelona
2000s in Barcelona
EuroHockey Nations Championship Men
EuroHockey Nations Championship
Field hockey at the Summer Olympics – Men's European qualification